Emerson Levy is an American attorney and politician serving as a member of the Oregon House of Representatives for the 53rd district. Elected in November 2022, she assumed office on January 9, 2023.

Education 
Levy earned a Bachelor of Science degree in international business from Brigham Young University and a Juris Doctor from Whittier Law School.

Career 
Outside of politics, Levy works as a self-employed renewable energy attorney. From 2017 to 2020, she was a real estate due diligence consultant at Sustainable Capital Finance. Levy was elected to the Oregon House of Representatives in November 2022.

References 

Living people
Oregon Democrats
Members of the Oregon House of Representatives
Women state legislators in Oregon
Oregon lawyers
People from Bend, Oregon
Brigham Young University alumni
Whittier Law School alumni
Year of birth missing (living people)